The Killer Who Wouldn't Die is a 1976 American TV film. It was a pilot for a proposed TV series.

Cast
Mike Connors

Reception
It was the ninth highest rated TV show of the week in the US.

References

External links
The Killer Who Wouldn't Die at BFI
The Killer Who Wouldn't Die at IMDb

1976 films
1976 television films
ABC network original films
American television films